Mirów  is a village in the administrative district of Gmina Niegowa, within Myszków County, Silesian Voivodeship, in southern Poland.

It is best known for the ruins of the 14th-century Mirów Castle, part of a defensive chain of medieval castles built along Polish Jura (Jura Krakowsko-Częstochowska). To the south of Mirów, there are Beskidy Mountains, including Silesian and Żywiec Beskids.

References

Villages in Myszków County